Euchrysops katangae is a butterfly in the family Lycaenidae. It is found in Lualaba Province of the Democratic Republic of the Congo and Zambia.

References

Euchrysops
Butterflies of Africa
Lepidoptera of the Democratic Republic of the Congo
Lepidoptera of Zambia
Lualaba Province